The Philippine International Pyromusical Competition initially known as the World Pyro Olympics, is an annual competition among fireworks manufacturers from different countries held in the Philippines which runs for five days for World Pyro Olympics and 6 weeks for The Philippine International Pyromusical Competition. Two countries fire each day; the last participant fires on the final evening of the event.

The host of the event does not participate in the competition but performs a fireworks display on the last night. Awards, such as the People's Choice, are given out after the exhibition. The crowning of the competition's winners ends the event.

As the World Pyro Olympics

2005
The first World Pyro Olympics took place in 2005 in The Esplanade at the back of then unfinished SM Mall of Asia in Pasay, Metro Manila, Philippines from December 26 to 30. Firework materials were placed in the participant's barge floating within Manila Bay. Major firework makers from nine countries participated in the competition. The event host, La Mancha Group of the Philippines along with the nine foreign fireworks makers, held a fireworks demonstration on the last day. La Mancha organized the 1st International Fireworks Festival in December 2002 and the World Pyro Olympics Exhibition in March and April 2004; Australia was awarded champion.

The schedule of the fireworks shows was as follows:

December 26, 2005
7:30pm  – Glorious Group
9:00pm  – Show FX Australia
December 27, 2005
7:30pm  – Nico Lünig Event
9:00pm  – Hanwha
December 28, 2005
7:30pm  – Orion Art Production International
9:00pm  – Celtic Fireworks
December 29, 2005
7:30pm  – Melrose Pyrotechnics
9:00pm  – Pyro Spectacular
December 30, 2005
7:30pm  – Flash Art Group
9:00pm  – La Mancha Fellowship of Fire (Closing)

2007
The event was hosted by the Philippines from January 5 to 13, 2007 at The Esplanade at the then newly completed SM Mall of Asia. Nine foreign countries competed in the second edition. La Mancha of the Philippines was the host company.
The United Kingdom won the 2007 competition and the team from China won an award for technical precision
January 5, 2007
8:00pm  – Show FX Australia
9:00pm  – Astondoa Piroteknia
January 6, 2007
8:00pm  – Melrose Pyrotechnics
9:00pm  – Astondoa Piroteknia
January 7, 2007
8:00pm  – Nico Lünig Event
9:00pm  – Westcoast Fireworks
January 12, 2007
8:00pm  – Bright Star Fireworks
9:00pm  – Pyro Studios
January 13, 2007
8:00pm  – Glorious Group
9:00pm  (La Mancha Fellowship of Fire)

2008
Once again, the World Pyro Olympics was hosted by the Philippines from May 3 to 31,  Saturdays only, at The Esplanade in front of the SM Mall of Asia. La Mancha Pyro Productions held a pyromusical display on the final night of the competition. The countries that participated were Canada, China, France, Germany, Italy, and Venezuela. Italy won the said competition.

May 3, 2008
7:30pm 
9:00pm 
May 10, 2008
7:30pm 
9:00pm 
May 18, 2008, Postponed due to heavy rains and rough seas brought by Tropical Storm Halong (Dindo).
May 24, 2008
7:30pm 
9:00pm 
May 31, 2008
7:30pm Fellowship of Fire (Highlights of the performances of all participants)
9:00pm  (A Pyromusical Exhibition of La Mancha Productions)

As the Philippine International Pyromusical Competition

2010

The 1st Philippine International Pyromusical Competition 2010 was held at SM Mall of Asia starting February to March. Patrons were given a platform to see how their own countries performed. The countries that participated were the United States, United Kingdom, China, France, Japan, Singapore, Malaysia and Australia. The Philippines provided the opening and closing exhibitions.

February 14, 2010
 – Platinum Fireworks Inc. (Opening Exhibition)
 – PyroFire Display
February 21, 2010
 – Jubilee Fireworks
 – Liuyang Jinsheng Fireworks
February 28, 2010
 – Brezac Artifices
 – Tamaya Kitahara Fireworks Co., Ltd.
March 7, 2010
 – Redhub Entertainment
 – Pyro Splendour Services
March 14, 2010
 – Howards And Sons Pyrotechnics
 – Platinum Fireworks Inc. (Closing Exhibition)

2011
The 2nd Philippine International PyroMusical Competition 2011 was held at the SM Mall of Asia starting February to March. The countries that participated were South Korea, Spain, Portugal, United Kingdom, China, France, Japan, Canada, Australia, and the Philippines.

February 12, 2011
 – Woori Fireworks
 – Pirotecnia Igual
February 19, 2011
 – Macedos Pirotecnia
 – Jubilee Fireworks
February 26, 2011
 – Liuyang Jinsheng Fireworks
 – Lacroix Ruggieri
March 5, 2011
 – Tamaya Kitahara Fireworks Co., Ltd.
 – Apogee Fireworks
March 12, 2011
 – Fireworx Inc.
 – Platinum Fireworks Inc. (Closing Exhibition)

2012
The 3rd Philippine International PyroMusical Competition 2012 was at the SM Mall of Asia starting February to March. Eleven countries showcased their pyrotechnics extravaganzas. The countries participated were South Korea, Malta, Spain, Finland, Portugal, China, Netherlands, Italy, Australia, Canada, and were closed by an exhibition curated by the Philippines.

February 11, 2012
 – Woori Fireworks 
 – Malta Fireworks
February 18, 2012
 – SM Art Pyrotechnics
 – Pirotecnia Turis
February 25, 2012
 – Oy Pyroman Finland Ltd.
 – Grupo Luso Pirotecnia
March 3, 2012
 – Liuyang Jinsheng Fireworks
 – Royal Fireworks Inc.
March 10, 2012
 – Fireworkx Inc.
 – Fireworks Spectacular
March 17, 2012
 – Orzella Fireworks
 – Platinum Fireworks Inc. (Closing Exhibition)

2013
The 4th Philippine International PyroMusical Competition 2013 was also held at the SM Mall of Asia, and commenced February, ending in March. The year 2013 saw Japan, Finland, Taiwan, Spain, United Kingdom, South Korea, Italy, Netherlands, China, Australia, and Canada as participants and the show was closed by an exhibition planned by the Philippines.

February 16, 2013
 – Tamaya Kitahara
 – Oy Pyroman Finland Ltd.
February 23, 2013
 – Yung Feng Fireworkds
 – Brunchu Pyro Experience
March 2, 2013
 – Jubilee Fireworks Ltd.
 – Hwarang Fireworks Inc.
March 9, 2013
 – Ipon Fireworks S.R.L
 – Royal Fireworks
March 16, 2013
 – Liuyang New Year Fireworks Manufacturing Co., Ltd.
 – Fireworkx Inc.
March 23, 2013
 – Fireworks Spectacular
 – Platinum Fireworks Inc. (Closing Exhibition)

2014
The 5th Philippine International Pyromusical Competition was held at the SM Mall Of Asia starting from February 15 – March 22, 2014. The 5th year of the competition were showcased by 11 countries, Australia, Spain, United Kingdom, France, Japan, China, Germany, Finland, Canada, USA and Philippines.

February 15, 2014
 - Platinum Fireworks Inc. (Opening Ceremony)
 - Howards and Sons Pyrotechnics
February 22, 2014
 - Bronchu Pyro Experience
 - Jubilee Fireworks
March 1, 2014
 - Brezac Artifices
 - Tamaya Kitahara Fireworks
March 8, 2014
 - Liuyang New Year Fireworks
 - Vulcan Europe
March 15, 2014
 - Oy Pyroman Finland Ltd.
 - Royal Pyrotechnie
March 22, 2014
 - Atlas Pyro Vision
 - Platinum Fireworks Inc. (Closing Exhibition)

2015

 - Platinum Fireworks Inc. (Opening and Closing Exhibition)
 - Akariya Fireworks
 - Martarello Group
 - Vision Show
 - Sirius Pyrotechnics
 - Royal Fireworks
 - Grupo Luso
 - Göteborgs FyrverkeriFabrik
 - Royal Pyrotechnie
 - Jubilee Fireworks
 - Polaris Fireworks

2016
The 7th Philippine International Pyromusical Competition was held at the SM Mall of Asia and was run every Saturday night from February 13 to March 19, 2016. 11 countries were showcased their pyromusical displays in the competition.

February 13, 2016
 - Platinum Fireworks Inc. (Opening Ceremony)
 - Luso Pirotecnica
February 20, 2016
 - Parente Fireworks
 - Pyrotex Fireworks
February 27, 2016
 - Atlas Pyro Vision
 - Royal Fireworks
March 5, 2016
 - Steffes-Oligfeurwerk
 - Fireworks Spectaculars
March 12, 2016
 - Skylighter Fireworx
 - Polaris Fireworks
March 19, 2016
 - Brezac Artefices
 - Platinum Fireworks Inc. (Closing Exhibition)

2017

February 11, 2017
 - Platinum Fireworks Inc. (Opening Ceremony)
 - Pyragic
February 18, 2017
 - Nico Events
 - Steffes-Oligfeurwerk
February 25, 2017
 - Lidu Fireworks
 - Polaris Fireworks
March 4, 2017
 - Hands Fireworks
 - Garden City Display Fireworks
March 11, 2017
 - Pyro 2000
 - Pyrotex Fireworks
March 18, 2017
 - Skylighter Fireworks
 - Platinum Fireworks Inc. (Closing Exhibition)

2018

February 17, 2018
 - Platinum Fireworks Inc. (Opening Ceremony)
 Sugyp SA
February 24, 2018
 - Pyro Engineering
 - Steffes-Ollig Feuerwerke
March 3, 2018
 - Fire-Events
 - Hands Fireworks
March 10, 2018
 - Pandora-Pyrotechnie
 - Alessi Fuochi Artificiali
March 17, 2018
 - Yung Feng Fireworks / 永豐煙火製造企業股份有限公司
 - Pyrotex Fireworx Ltd
March 24, 2018
 - Polaris Fireworks
 - Platinum Fireworks Inc. (Closing Exhibition)

2019
The 10th Philippine International Pyromusical Competition 2019 was held at the SM City Clark starting February 23 to March 30. This was supposed to be at the SM Mall of Asia, however, the venue was moved at Clark, Pampanga in support for the Manila Bay Rehabilitation Program by the Department of Environment and Natural Resources (DENR).

February 23, 2019
 - Platinum Fireworks Inc. (Opening Ceremony)
 - CBF Pyrotechnics
March 2, 2019
 - Pirotecnia Minhota
 - Steffes-Ollig Feuerwerke
March 9, 2019
 - Brezac Artefices
 - Oy Pyroman
March 16, 2019
 - Viviano S.R.L.
 - Pyrotex Fireworks Ltd.
March 23, 2019
 - Polaris Fireworks
 - Fireworks Spectaculars
March 30, 2019
 - Surex Firma Rodzinna
 - Platinum Fireworks Inc. (Closing Ceremony)

11th edition
The 11th Philippine International Pyromusical Competition was supposed to be held in 2020. However, the competition was not held in 2020, 2021 and 2022 due to the COVID-19 pandemic.

Participating teams
(Host nation highlighted.)

Winners

(*) Also the recipient of the People's Choice Award

References

External links
World Pyro Olympics at WN
2009 World Pyromusical Olympics Updates
World Pyro Olympics 2009 
World Pyro Olympics 2009 Updates
Ticketnet

Fireworks competitions
Events in Metro Manila
Festivals established in 2005